The Nene Way is a waymarked long-distance footpath in England running through the English counties of Northamptonshire, Cambridgeshire and Lincolnshire. It generally follows the course of the River Nene.

Distance

The route
The Nene Way broadly follows the course of the River Nene and starts in Badby, Northamptonshire, ending in Sutton Bridge, Lincolnshire, passing en route through Northampton town and the city of Peterborough, the market towns of Thrapston, Oundle and Whittlesey, and villages such as Fotheringay.   It has recently been terminated in Northampton due to building works. This has been reported to the ramblers association and the Northamptonshire Council as such a way is of historical interest and cannot be simply terminated.

Attractions
The route permits walkers to explore bluebell woods in season, wildlife havens and follow in the footsteps of Mary, Queen of Scots and the poet H.E. Bates.

External links
The Nene Way explained on the Explore Northamptonshire website

Long-distance footpaths in England
Footpaths in Northamptonshire
Footpaths in Cambridgeshire
Footpaths in Lincolnshire
River Nene
England